Lateefat Modupe Okunnu (3 December 1939) is a Nigerian retired civil servant and administrator who was the Deputy Governor of Lagos State from 1990 to 1992. She was caretaker chairman of the National Republican Convention in 1993.

Okunnu is a founding member of the Federation of Muslim Women's Associations in Nigeria (FOMWAN).

Life
Lateefat Modupe Okunnu was born in Lagos and educated at Okepopo Primary School, Lagos Island, Methodist Girls' High School and Queens College, Yaba. She has a bachelor of arts degree in geography and earned a postgraduate diploma in education from the University of Lagos in 1968. From 1967 to 1970, Okunnu worked with University of Lagos as an assistant lecturer. Thereafter, she joined Lagos State Civil Service as an education officer. She was with the State government until 1980, after which she moved to the federal civil service as a principal secretary in the Federal Ministry of Agriculture. In 1986, she became a permanent secretary in the cabinet office. Okunnu was among the group of elite women who formed the Federation of Muslim Women's Associations in Nigeria. She was the pioneer vice president (amirah) of the organization and also head of the Lagos State chapter. She was involved in education matters within the Lagos State chapter of FOMWAN and encouraged the use of mosque grounds as crèche and also formation of education committees within mosques. In 1989, she became the president of FOMWAN.
In 1987, as a civil servant, Okunnu was member of the nine member committee inaugurated to review recommendations of the 1986 Political Bureau. In 1990, she was appointed Deputy Governor of Lagos, along with Pamela Sadauki of Kaduna State, the duo where the first female Deputy Governors in Nigeria.

References

Nigerian educational theorists
Nigerian civil servants
Yoruba women in politics
Deputy Governors of Lagos State
Women in Lagos politics
Academic staff of the University of Lagos
Yoruba women academics
Nigerian Muslims
Methodist Girls' High School alumni
Queen's College, Lagos alumni
1939 births
Living people
Politicians from Lagos
University of Lagos alumni